= Venice Tap Water =

Environmental initiative promoting tap water use in Venice

Venice Tap Water is an environmental and cultural initiative based in Venice, Italy. Founded in 2019 by Venetian environmental activist Marco Capovilla, it promotes the use of tap water and public drinking fountains as an alternative to bottled water to reduce single-use plastic waste. The initiative is best known for an interactive map of drinking fountains in Venice and the surrounding lagoon islands.

== History ==
Marco Capovilla founded Venice Tap Water in 2019 to encourage residents and visitors to use Venice's public drinking fountains and reduce plastic pollution. By 2023, the initiative had published an online map showing fountains in Venice's historic centre and on nearby islands.

LifeGate reported that the map had been developed with information from Veritas, the company responsible for Venice's water supply. In addition to fountain locations, the website provided access to water-quality information and material about the history and design of individual fountains.

In 2023, la Repubblica described the project as an effort to address the lack of public awareness that Venice's mains water is drinkable. The newspaper reported that the map was being promoted to visitors through accommodation providers and that a mobile application was being developed to help users locate the nearest fountain.

== Activities ==
The project maintains a digital map of public drinking fountains and conducts campaigns promoting the use of reusable bottles.

In May 2025, the Venetian newspaper La Nuova Venezia reported on Venice Tap Water's campaign concerning poorly functioning public fountains. The initiative called on the municipal government to replace malfunctioning push-button mechanisms and improve access to drinking water. The newspaper described the project's fountain map as being continually updated.

The European Network of Cultural Centres has described Venice Tap Water as a project combining digital mapping, artistic practices and community participation to promote water as a shared resource and encourage refill habits.

In June 2026, Venice Tap Water presented its approach to refill culture at events associated with Toronto Climate Week and London Climate Action Week.

== Support ==
In 2026, Venice Tap Water was selected by Italia Patria della Bellezza for its strategic communication and branding programme, with Publifarm supporting the project.

== Artistic activity ==
In 2026, Capovilla and Venetian artist and designer Lorenza Cossutta presented I Pollute Therefore I Am at the Royal Academy Summer Exhibition in London. The work used a disposable polyethylene terephthalate water bottle as a symbol of plastic consumption and was connected to the environmental campaigning of Venice Tap Water. The title reworks Barbara Kruger's I Shop Therefore I Am and the Cartesian expression cogito, ergo sum. According to the artists, removing the bottle's commercial label was intended to transform it from a branded product into a more general representation of disposable consumption. Cossutta and Capovilla described I Pollute Therefore I Am as part of Venice Tap Water's broader work combining mapping, data collection, public-space interventions and visual communication.
